Run to Be Born is the title of Walking Concert's debut album which was released on September 7, 2004.

Track listing
 "What's Your New Thing?"
 "Aluminium"
 "But You Know...Its True"
 "Run To Be Born"
 "Studio Space"
 "Girls In The Field"
 "The Animals"
 "Audrey"
 "What Does Your Heart Say?"
 "Hands Up!"
 "Mustang Ford"
 "Calypso Slide"
 "A Lot To Expect"
 "Ok"

Album credits
Walter Schreifels - 		Performer 
Walking Concert		 - Main Performer

References

2004 albums
Walking Concert albums